Tiger True is a 1921 American silent mystery film directed by J.P. McGowan and starring Frank Mayo, Fritzi Brunette and Elinor Hancock.

Cast
 Frank Mayo as Jack Lodge
 Fritzi Brunette as Mary Dover
 Elinor Hancock as Mrs. Lodge 
 Al Kaufman as Larry Boynton
 Walter Long as Old Whitey / The Baboon
 Charles Brinley as McGuire
 Herbert Bethew as Sanford
 Henry A. Barrows as Mr. Lodge

References

Bibliography
 Connelly, Robert B. The Silents: Silent Feature Films, 1910-36, Volume 40, Issue 2. December Press, 1998.
 Munden, Kenneth White. The American Film Institute Catalog of Motion Pictures Produced in the United States, Part 1. University of California Press, 1997.

External links
 

1921 films
1921 mystery films
American silent feature films
American mystery films
Films directed by J. P. McGowan
American black-and-white films
Universal Pictures films
1920s English-language films
1920s American films
Silent mystery films